The 121st Pennsylvania House of Representatives District is located in Luzerne County and has been represented by Eddie Day Pashinski since 2007. The district includes the following areas:

 Bear Creek Township
 Bear Creek Village
 Buck Township
 Laurel Run
 Plains Township
 Wilkes-Barre
 Wilkes-Barre Township

Representatives

Recent election results

References

External links
District Map from the United States Census Bureau
Pennsylvania House Legislative District Maps from the Pennsylvania Redistricting Commission.  
Population Date for District 45 from the Pennsylvania Redistricting Commission.

Government of Luzerne County, Pennsylvania
121